The Chilean marked gecko (Garthia gaudichaudii) is a species of gecko endemic to the Chilean matorral ecoregion, found chiefly in the nation of Chile (Hogan & World Wildlife Fund 2013). The common name for this species is Chilean marked gecko.

Taxonomy
This organism was first described by André Marie Constant Duméril and Gabriel Bibron in the year 1836 as a new species of lizard, Gymnodactylus gaudichaudii.  Over the years the species has been assigned to several different genera by various authorities. Most recently, it has been placed in the genus Garthia.

Etymology
The specific name, gaudichaudii, is in honor of French botanist Charles Gaudichaud-Beaupré.

References

External links
Hogan, C. Michael, & World Wildlife Fund (2013). Chilean matorral. ed. M.McGinley. Encyclopedia of Earth. National Council for Science and the Environment. Washington DC
Encyclopedia of Life (2013). Homonota gaudichaudii

Further reading
Duméril AMC, Bibron G (1836). Erpétologie générale ou Histoire naturelle complète des Reptiles, Tome troisième [General Herpetology or Complete Natural History of the Reptiles, Volume 3]. Paris: Roret. iv + 517 pp. (Gymnodactylus gaudichaudii, new species, pp. 413–414).

Garthia
Taxa named by André Marie Constant Duméril
Taxa named by Gabriel Bibron
Reptiles described in 1836
Endemic fauna of Chile